The 1973 Belmont Stakes was the 105th running of the Belmont Stakes at Belmont Park in Elmont, New York, held on June 9, 1973. Facing a field of five horses, Secretariat won by 31 lengths, the largest margin of victory in Belmont history, in front of a crowd of 69,138 spectators. His winning time of 2 minutes and 24 seconds still stands as the American record for a mile and a half on dirt. The event was televised and broadcast over the radio.

Secretariat was widely viewed as the favorite to win by most sportswriters and people; however, the added distance and the possibility of running too slow for a distance or running too fast too soon could potentially cause him to lose. Out of the starting gate, Secretariat and Sham traded the lead. Around the three-quarters mile marker Sham began to fade and Secretariat began to extend an advantage. Twice a Prince and My Gallant overtook Sham to take second and third, respectively. Sham finished last, behind Pvt. Smiles, who was in last before Sham slowed severely.

The victory in the Belmont, when combined with Secretariat's previous victories in the Kentucky Derby and the Preakness Stakes, meant he completed the Triple Crown of Thoroughbred Racing. This was significant, as Secretariat became the ninth horse to complete the feat and broke a 25-year drought where no horse had completed the achievement.

Pre-race coverage
Secretariat, Sham, Pvt. Smiles, and My Gallant were the first four horses to be entered into the Belmont Stakes. Secretariat, winner of both the Kentucky Derby and the Preakness Stakes, was the odds on favorite to win the event. The added distance of the Belmont when compared to the Derby and Preakness was found to be one potential reason for Secretariat to lose the race. Steve Cady of The New York Times wrote that Secretariat could be defeated if the pace of the race went too fast or was too slow for too long, in both of which scenarios he felt Sham would win. Sham received significant attention as well and was thought to be the second best horse, along with having the potential of becoming the first horse to be runner-up in all the Triple Crown races. My Gallant was considered the best of the rest, especially as he was the progeny of Gallant Man, who set the Belmont Stakes course record of 2: in the 1957 edition.

Knightly Dawn was entered into the race on June 6 and was thought to bring early speed to the race and alter the way it would be run. Before Knightly Dawn's entry, Secretariat was speculated to lead from the race's start. With the presence of Knightly Dawn, William Boniface of The Baltimore Sun believed that Secretariat would have to run faster earlier on, thus making the final half-mile more unpredictable. Pancho Martin, the trainer of Knightly Dawn, said he would only run the horse if it rained as Knightly Dawn's only previous success had been in the Jersey Derby on a sloppy track. However, Knightly Dawn was scratched prior to race day.

There was much speculation going into the Stakes over Secretariat's bid for the Triple Crown. Since 1948, when Citation achieved the feat, there had been six horses that had won both the Kentucky Derby and the Preakness Stakes before failing in the Belmont Stakes. When comparing Secretariat to those six horses' health and fitness before the Belmont Stakes, writer Boniface felt Secretariat was in the best shape, almost as good as when he entered the Kentucky Derby weeks prior. Just days before the Belmont, Secretariat ran five furlongs in just under a minute in a morning workout. Following that, Secretariat's jockey Ron Turcotte told reporters that Secretariat was ready for a top charge on Saturday.

Event details
Post time for the race was 5:38 PM EDT. It was televised by CBS, and aired on CBS Radio. The weather during the race was clear and the course conditions were fast. The scratch of Knightly Dawn before the race was held reduced the purse to $150,200, which was awarded to the first through fourth-place finishers in the sums of $90,120, $33,044, $18,024, and $9,012, respectively.

Attendance figures were speculated to be around 70,000 leading up to the race, which was accurate as the official attendance for the event was reported to be 69,138. This became the second-most attended Belmont Stakes at the time, after the 1971 race that had 82,694 in attendance.

Race summary

Out of the starting gate, Secretariat and Sham raced evenly through the first turn. Through a half-mile, the two were even. Entering the backstretch and approaching three-quarters of a mile, Secretariat began to distance himself as Sham began to fade, ultimately finishing last. It was later discovered that Sham had suffered a hairline fracture of his right front cannon bone during the race, which ended his racing career.

Secretariat continued to extend his advantage for the rest of the race, finishing 31 lengths over the second-place finisher, Twice a Prince. Twice a Prince started slowly and moved along the rail until reaching second position, passing Sham and outpacing My Gallant. Track announcer Chic Anderson described Secretariat's move from the backstretch with the famous call, "Secretariat is widening now. He is moving like a tremendous machine!"

Secretariat set the Belmont Stakes track record at 2:24 and the record for largest margin of victory. Secretariat also broke the American record for a mile-and-a-half on a dirt track, breaking the previous record of 2:, set by Going Abroad in 1964.

Results

Post positions: 1. Secretariat, 2. Pvt. Smiles, 3. My Gallant, 4. Twice a Prince, 5. Sham

Payout

 Exacta: (2–5) $35.20

Analysis
Neil Milbert of the Chicago Tribune wrote that Secretariat "ran what may have been the greatest horse race in history." When asked about Secretariat's margin of victory, trainer Lucien Laurin stated: "Naturally, not that big!" He further commented on Sham's performance saying "The horse we had to kill, we did." My Gallant's jockey Ángel Cordero Jr. said Secretariat was "just like a car." Secretariat's jockey Ron Turcotte told the press that he saw the timer on the track hit 2:20 and he told himself "Oh I can make it" and continued to press Secretariat forward to break the course record. The UPI wrote that Secretariat's performance in the race put him in the ranks of the greatest race horses of all-time.

That day at Belmont Park, $7.9 million was wagered on the nine races that were held during the day, which includes $2.2 million from off-track betting. A total of $5.6 million was bet through the mutuels that day. The Stakes itself had $519,689 bet on it. Bettors holding 5,617 winning parimutuel tickets on Secretariat never redeemed them, presumably keeping them as souvenirs.

Aftermath

Through his combined victories at the Belmont Stakes, Preakness Stakes, and Kentucky Derby, Secretariat became the ninth horse to complete the Triple Crown of Thoroughbred Racing, and the first horse since Citation in 1948, ending a 25-year period without a Triple Crown winner. Secretariat's times in all three Triple Crown races were course records and still stand.

Following the Belmont, Secretariat was allowed several weeks rest before entering a few more competitions and then starting his a career as a stud, where he had been syndicated for close to $6.08 million.

In part due to accomplishing the Triple Crown and winning other races during the 1973 calendar season, Secretariat won Horse of the Year for the second consecutive year. In addition, he also won Eclipse Awards as the American Champion Three-Year-Old Male Horse and the American Champion Male Turf Horse. He was inducted to the Thoroughbred Horse Racing Hall of Fame in 1974.

Although Secretariat sired several successful racehorses, he ultimately was most influential through his daughters' offspring. His daughters produced several notable sires, and through them Secretariat appears in the pedigree of many modern champions. Secretariat died in 1989 due to laminitis, at age 19. He is recognized as the greatest horse in racing history.

References

Notes

Citations

Further reading

External links
 Secretariat Belmont Stakes 1973 & extended coverage via YouTube
 1973 Belmont Stakes racing chart at belmontstakes.com

Belmont Stakes races
Belmont Stakes
Belmont Stakes
Belmont Stakes
Belmont Stakes